Njenga is a name of Kenyan origin that is derived from Kikuyu traditional food prepared from crushed maize. It is an alternative dish to the more expensive rice during ceremonies. Njenga is also a Kikuyu name for boys born during harvest season.

Njenga Karume (1929–2012), Kenyan politician and businessman
Daniel Njenga (born 1976), Kenyan marathon runner and two-time Tokyo Marathon champion
Gitau wa Njenga (born 1971), Kenyan photojournalist and politician
John Njenga (born 1928), Kenyan former archbishop
John Michael Njenga Mututho, Kenyan politician for the Kenya African National Union

See also
Mukuru kwa Njenga, slum area in Nairobi, Kenya

Kenyan names